Kosher Check is a hechsher of the Orthodox Rabbinical Council of British Columbia. Its symbol is used on labels of food which are certified Kosher by the Council. Kosher Check is headquartered in Vancouver, British Columbia.

Kosher Chek has an international network of regional coordinators and Rabbinic representatives, all of them strictly Orthodox in their personal practice. Regional coordinators are based in Asia, Europe, and North America.

The Orthodox Rabbinical Council of British Columbia is a recommended kosher certifying agency by the Chicago Rabbinical Council (CRC).

In November 2013 BC Kosher was renamed Kosher Check with the tagline "Kosher Checked. Globally Accepted," and the new symbol was introduced. The hechsher is only available to manufacturers of food that have enhanced food-safety protocols. Today Kosher Check certifies thousands of products produced by manufacturers all around the world.

See also
Food safety
Hechsher
Kashrut
Orthodox Judaism

References

External links
 Official website of Kosher Check Kosher Certification
 Official website of the Orthodox Rabbinical Council of BC
 Glatt Kosher

Jews and Judaism in British Columbia
Kosher food certification organizations
Religious consumer symbols